Esmailabad (also Romanized as Esmā‘īlābād; also known as Esmā‘īlābād-e Fasārūd) is a village in Paskhan Rural District, in the Central District of Darab County, Fars Province, Iran. At the 2006 census, its population was 698, in 164 families.

References 

Populated places in Darab County